The Timblo class interceptor craft is a class of ten vessels built by Timblo Drydocks Pvt. Ltd, Goa for the Indian Coast Guard.

Description
The rigid hull watercraft in this class are 9.8 meters long with a displacement of 7 tonnes. The beam of each craft is 3.1 m and the draught is 0.6 m. The hull of crafts is made of fibre reinforced plastic. These boats are powered by twin mercury on-board motors of 250 hp each. This gives a speed of 37 knots which is comfortably in excess of the contractual requirement of 32 knots. The crafts have a partially enclosed cabin with ballistic protection of MIJ111 standards. The fuel carry capacity of the craft is 600 litres. There is also a gunmount for a light machine gun. The vessels are equipped with VHF communication, search and rescue transponder and GPS, along with other navigation and communication equipment.

Vessels in the class

See also
 Timblo class patrol craft
 Mandovi Marine (12.5-Meter) Class Patrol Craft
 Swallow Craft Class Inshore Patrol Vessel
 AMPL Class

External links
Pennant no
Commissioning
Specifications
Timblo Group to set up shipbuilding facility
Fast attack craft of the Indian Coast Guard
Gunboat classes